This is a list of the National Register of Historic Places listings in Colorado County, Texas.

This is intended to be a complete list of properties and districts listed on the National Register of Historic Places in Colorado County, Texas. There are two districts and five individual properties listed on the National Register in the county which includes two former properties. Three individually listed properties are Recorded Texas Historic Landmarks including one that is also a State Antiquities Landmark. One district contains additional Recorded Texas Historic Landmarks.

Current listings

The locations of National Register properties and districts may be seen in a mapping service provided.

|}

Former listings

|}

See also

National Register of Historic Places listings in Texas
Recorded Texas Historic Landmarks in Colorado County

References

External links

Colorado County, Texas
Colorado County
Buildings and structures in Colorado County, Texas